Bazaar Township is a township in Chase County, Kansas, United States.  As of the 2000 census, its population was 81.

Geography
The streams of Baker Creek, Den Creek, East Branch Sharpes Creek, Folsom Creek, Kirk Creek, Nickel Creek, Norton Creek, Rock Creek, Sharpes Creek and Yeager Creek run through this township.

In what remains of the community of Bazaar, the Bazaar United Methodist Church continues to hold weekly worship services at 8:30 each Sunday morning except for the first weekend in June when Chase County churches meet at the Strong City Rodeo grounds for Cowboy Church.

Communities
The township contains the following settlements:
 Unincorporated community of Bazaar.

Cemeteries
The township contains the following cemeteries:
 Bazaar.

See also
 1931 Transcontinental & Western Air Fokker F-10 crash, known as the "Knute Rockne plane crash"

Further reading

References

External links
 Chase County Website
 City-Data.com
 Chase County Maps: Current, Historic, KDOT

Townships in Chase County, Kansas
Townships in Kansas